Francisco Miguel Lindor Serrano (born November 14, 1993), nicknamed "Mr. Smile", is a Puerto Rican professional baseball shortstop for the New York Mets of Major League Baseball (MLB). He previously played for the Cleveland Indians. A right-handed thrower and switch hitter, Lindor stands  and weighs .

Lindor batted over .300 in both his first two major league seasons and provided elite defense. In 2016, he earned his first All-Star selection and  Gold Glove Award, becoming the first Puerto Rican shortstop to win the Gold Glove Award.  He won his first Silver Slugger Award in 2017.  He placed second in the American League Rookie of the Year voting in 2015 and was a selection to the 2017 All-WBC Team.

Born in Caguas, Puerto Rico, Lindor began playing baseball at an early age, and he moved with his family to Florida when he was 12.  He became the Indians' first round selection, and eighth overall, in the 2011 MLB draft.  In the minor leagues, he participated in the 2012 All-Star Futures Game, and by 2013, was rated by Baseball America as the Indians' top overall prospect.

Early life
Lindor was born in Caguas, Puerto Rico, on November 14, 1993, the third of four children of Miguel Angel Lindor and Maria Serrano. He began playing baseball at a young age, assisted by his father, who would hit him ground balls from the top of a hill while the younger Lindor stood partway down the slope, attempting to field them. Lindor's favorite baseball players as a child were all middle infielders: Robbie Alomar, Omar Vizquel, Derek Jeter, Jimmy Rollins and Barry Larkin.

Lindor moved to Central Florida at the age of 12, with his father, stepmother and youngest sibling, and was enrolled at the Montverde Academy prep school. After he signed with the Cleveland Indians in August 2011, his mother and two older siblings joined him in Florida.

Professional career

Draft and early career
Lindor attended Montverde Academy in Montverde, Florida. The school's baseball facility was named after him in 2013. He was named to the USA Today All-USA high school baseball team. The Indians drafted Lindor in the first round (eighth overall) of the 2011 MLB draft. He had a full-ride scholarship offer in place with the Florida State Seminoles baseball team, but chose to sign with the Indians for $2.9 million in August. In September, Lindor was drafted by the Indios de Mayagüez in the second round of the Liga de Béisbol Profesional Roberto Clemente's (LBPRC) first year draft. However, he has been unable to play there due to Cleveland's intervention. On May 7, 2014, the Indios de Mayagüez traded Lindor's LBPRC player rights to the Gigantes de Carolina in exchange for Carlos Correa. However, only two weeks later the Cangrejeros de Santurce signed him by exploiting a legal loophole declaring that any player that has not been officially contracted within three years after being drafted is considered a free agent.

Minor leagues (2011–2015)
Lindor began his professional career with the Short-Season A New York-Penn League Mahoning Valley Scrappers during the 2011 season and appeared in four games. MLB.com rated Lindor as the 32nd best prospect in baseball before the 2012 season. He was assigned to the Lake County Captains of the Class A Midwest League, and named to appear in the 2012 All-Star Futures Game. In 122 games for Lake County, Lindor had a .257 batting average with six home runs, 42 RBIs, 33 extra-base hits and 27 stolen bases.

Prior to the 2012 season, Baseball America ranked him as the Indians top prospect. Lindor started the 2013 season with the Carolina Mudcats of the Class A-Advanced Carolina League. He was promoted to the Akron Aeros of the Class AA Eastern League on July 15, 2013. Between the two levels, Lindor batted .303 with two home runs, 34 RBIs, 31 extra-base hits, and 25 stolen bases in 104 games.

Lindor began the 2014 season with Akron. The Indians promoted Lindor to the Columbus Clippers of the Class AAA International League on July 21, 2014. In 126 games between the two clubs, he batted .276 with 11 home runs, 62 RBIs, and 28 stolen bases. Lindor began the 2015 season with Columbus.

Cleveland Indians (2015–2020)

2015
The Indians purchased Lindor's contract from Columbus on June 14, 2015 and added him to the active roster. In 59 games for Columbus prior to his promotion, he was batting .284 with two home runs and 22 RBIs. He made his debut with the Indians that day as a pinch hitter. He stayed in the game and recorded his first major league hit. Lindor won the American League (AL) Rookie of the Month Award for September, during which he batted .362. He finished the 2015 season with a .313 batting average, 12 home runs, 51 RBIs, 12 stolen bases and 22 doubles in 99 games for the Indians. He placed second in the AL Rookie of the Year Award voting.

2016: World Series

In 2016, Lindor finished season with a .301 batting average, 15 home runs, 78 RBIs, 19 stolen bases, 15 sacrifice flies (leading the majors), and 30 doubles in 158 games for the Indians. He was named a Gold Glove Award Finalist in the AL Shortstop position along with José Iglesias and Andrelton Simmons. In the 2016 MLB postseason, Lindor's seven multi-hit games broke the record for most ever for a player less than 23 years old. His 16 postseason hits are also the most hits by a  batter since 1997, and he's the youngest Cleveland batter to have six World Series hits. Following the 2016 season, Lindor was presented with his first Gold Glove Award and first Platinum Glove Award.  Lindor was the 2016 Esurance MLB/This Year in Baseball Award winner for Best Defensive Player.  He finished ninth in the AL Most Valuable Player Award (MVP) voting.

2017

On April 5, 2017, Lindor hit his first career grand slam, doing so against the Texas Rangers, as the Indians won 9−6 and swept the season-opening series. On July 22, 2017 Lindor hit his first career walk-off home run in the 10th inning versus the Toronto Blue Jays for a 2−1 victory.

In Game 2 of the 2017 ALDS versus the New York Yankees, Lindor became the third shortstop in major league history to hit a grand slam in the postseason.

In 159 games for Cleveland, Lindor batted .273 with 33 home runs and 89 RBIs. End of season awards for Lindor in 2017 included selection as shortstop on Baseball America'''s All-MLB Team, and his first career Silver Slugger Award at shortstop.  He finished fifth in the AL MVP voting, and was selected as the cover athlete of the video game R.B.I. Baseball 18.''

2018
Lindor won the first two AL Player of the Week Awards of his career in consecutive weeks of May 6 and 13, 2018.  For the week of May 6, he led MLB with 17 hits, 11 runs scored and 33 total bases over eight games.  He also batted .426, four doubles, and four home runs.  However, he committed critical errors on consecutive dates that led to losses versus the Yankees in both games.  The following week, he hit four home runs and five RBI.  In the May 12 game versus Kansas City, Lindor both homered and doubled twice.  On June 1, he again homered twice and doubled twice versus Minnesota, including hitting the game-winning home run in the eighth inning.  He became the fourth major leaguer in history to produce at least two doubles and two home runs in a single game twice in one season, following Rafael Palmeiro (1993), Jim Edmonds (2003), and Adrián Beltré (2007).  Due to his tremendous month of May, Lindor was named AL Player of the Month.  He led all players with 44 hits and 27 runs scored.  His .373 batting average was third and his 1.169 OPS was placed fourth among all players in at least 100 plate appearances.

Lindor collected three hits and four runs scored, including a home run, on July 1 versus Oakland.  On July 2, he homered twice, including a grand slam and another for three runs, for a career-high seven RBI to power a 9–3 victory over the Royals.  He became the second shortstop in the franchise history to drive in seven runs in a game, following Chico Carrasquel versus the Kansas City Athletics on April 26, 1956. In 2018, Lindor was selected to the 2018 All-Star Game, his third consecutive All-Star appearance. On July 10, Lindor scored his 80th run before the All-Star Break, thus breaking the record for most by a Puerto Rican MLB player which was previously 79 runs in 1996 by Edgar Martínez. On August 8, 2018 Lindor hit a 3 run walk-off home run in the 9th inning versus the Minnesota Twins for a 5–2 victory. For the season, he batted .277 and was 3rd in the league in power-speed number (30.2), winning the Silver Slugger award in consecutive years.

Lindor was the lone offensive spark for the Indians in the ALDS, batting .364 with 2 home runs, but the Indians were swept in 3 games by the Astros. Outside of Lindor, the rest of the team batted .144 in the three-game sweep and bowed out of the playoffs in the first round for the second year in a row.

2019

In 2019, Lindor was again an All-Star and won his second Gold Glove Award at shortstop. He finished fifteenth in MVP voting.

2020
Lindor struggled with the 2020 Cleveland Indians. He batted .258 with eight home runs and 27 RBIs in 60 games. His batting average, on-base percentage, slugging percentage and wRC+ were all career worsts and he struggled especially against breaking pitches. His defense, however, remained among the best in the league.

New York Mets (2021–present)
On January 7, 2021, the Indians traded Lindor and Carlos Carrasco to the New York Mets for Amed Rosario, Andrés Giménez, Josh Wolf, and Isaiah Greene.

2021
On March 31, 2021, just hours before Lindor's deadline of Opening Day on April 1, the Mets and Lindor agreed to a 10-year, $341 million extension that would keep him with the team through 2031. Lindor struggled during the first half of the 2021 season and was booed by the Citi Field home crowd on multiple occasions. Lindor went 3-for-4 with two home runs off of Nationals starter Joe Ross, accounting for all five RBIs in the Mets' 5-1 victory on June 19. In a Subway Series showdown on September 12, Lindor hit three home runs in the same game for the first time in his career. The boys of Puerto Rican podcast "Los Del Colegio Podcast" created the chant "Lindor es tu papá" which means "Lindor is your daddy", referring to an altercation with Giancarlo Stanton in that game. He ended the season batting .230, with 20 home runs and 10 stolen bases, in 125 games played.

2022
On April 8, 2022, Lindor was hit on the head on a pitch by Steve Cishek. On May 31, 2022, Lindor was named the National League Player of the Week; he drove in a run in every game during that week and slashed .348/.407/.870. It was his third time receiving that distinction in either league. On June 1, he became the second player in Mets history to record an RBI in a streak of ten consecutive games, joining Mike Piazza (1999). Lindor is just the seventh shortstop ever, and the first since Hanley Ramirez (2009), to put together such a streak. On August 14, Lindor recorded his 82nd RBI of the season, breaking José Reyes’ Mets franchise record for the most RBIs recorded in a season by a shortstop, in a 6-0 victory over the Philadelphia Phillies. On September 15, Lindor recorded his 24th home run of the season against the Pittsburgh Pirates, setting a new Mets single season record for most home runs by a shortstop. He also recorded his 93rd and 94th RBIs of the season, a new career high.

At the end of the season, Lindor was announced as the 2022 winner of the Marvin Miller Man of the Year Award. On December 6, 2022, Lindor was named to the All-MLB Second Team.

International career

World Junior Baseball Championship (United States)
In 2010, he played for the 18U United States team in the 2010 World Junior Baseball Championship, in Thunder Bay, Ontario. They finished in fifth place despite only losing one game. Lindor was named to the All-IBAF Juniors Team in his position at short-stop.

2017 WBC
Lindor played for the Puerto Rican national team at the 2017 World Baseball Classic (WBC). He was selected the MVP of Pool D, where team Puerto Rico attained a 3–0 record.  His offensive stats in the first round included five hits in 11 at bats for a .455 average, two HR, four RBI, and four runs scored. Puerto Rico went undefeated in the first and second rounds until losing to the United States in the championship game.  Following the conclusion of the tournament, he was named to the 2017 All-WBC team.

See also
 Cleveland Indians award winners and league leaders
 List of Major League Baseball annual runs scored leaders
 List of Major League Baseball players from Puerto Rico

References

External links

1993 births
Living people
Akron Aeros players
Akron RubberDucks players
American League All-Stars
Carolina Mudcats players
Cleveland Indians players
Columbus Clippers players
Gold Glove Award winners
Lake County Captains players
Mahoning Valley Scrappers players
Major League Baseball players from Puerto Rico
Major League Baseball shortstops
Montverde Academy alumni
New York Mets players
People from Caguas, Puerto Rico
Peoria Javelinas players
Silver Slugger Award winners
United States national baseball team players
2017 World Baseball Classic players
2023 World Baseball Classic players